The 2013 FIA GT Nogaro, also known as 2013 Easter Cup (French: Coupes de Pâques 2013) was the first of six rounds in the 2013 FIA GT Series season. It took place at the Circuit Paul Armagnac in France between 30 March – 1 April 2013. The race was the first race under the newly renamed FIA GT Series after the FIA GT1 World Championship name was discontinued due to no GT1-spec cars competing.

The most notable entrants are nine-times World Rally Championship champion Sébastien Loeb racing with his own team and former professional football goalkeeper Fabien Barthez competing racing in the Gentleman Trophy with SOFREV Auto Sport Promotion. Also competing in the race is reigning FIA GT3 European Championship Teams champions HTP Gravity Charouz as well as one of the reigning Drivers' champions from 2012 Maximilian Bühk who will enter in the Pro Cup. His team mate last season Dominik Baumann also competes in the series for Grasser Racing in the Pro-Am Cup.

Qualifying

Qualifying result
Qualifying took place on Saturday 30 March and determined the grid for the Qualifying Race the next day. Rather than the usual knockout qualifying sessions seen in the past series, there were two qualifying sessions for all twenty-four cars. The fastest ten times from the two combined sessions would go through to the Superpole session where they would compete for pole position. Seeing as the first session was partly wet, everybody set their fastest time in session two. As a result, the fastest ten drivers from session two went through to the Superpole session.

René Rast set the fastest time in the Superpole session for Belgian Audi Club Team WRT and would start in pole position for the Qualifying Race.

Race results
Class winners in bold.

Qualifying Race

Championship Race

Nogaro
Nogaro